Leo V the Armenian (Leōn ho ex Armenias;  775 – 25 December 820) was the Byzantine emperor from 813 to 820. A senior general, he forced his predecessor, Michael I Rangabe, to abdicate and assumed the throne. He ended the decade-long war with the Bulgars, and initiated the second period of Byzantine Iconoclasm. He was assassinated by supporters of Michael the Amorian, one of his most trusted generals, who succeeded him on the throne.

Life
Leo was the son of the patrician Bardas, who was of Armenian descent (according to Theophanes Continuatus, Leo was also of Assyrian/Syrian descent). Leo served in 803 under the rebel general Bardanes Tourkos, whom he deserted in favor of Emperor Nikephoros I. The Emperor rewarded Leo with two palaces, but later exiled him for marrying the daughter of another rebel, the patrician Arsaber. On the other hand, a contemporary source says that one general Leo of the Armeniakon theme was punished for his humiliating defeat by the Arabs during which he also lost the salaries of his thematic units (a modern scholar suggests that this Leo is not the same as the emperor). Punishment also included deprivation of his military rank, beating and hair cutting.

Reign

Recalled by Michael I Rangabe in 811, Leo became governor of the Anatolic theme and conducted himself well in a war against the Arabs in 812, defeating the forces of the Cilician thughur under Thabit ibn Nasr.  Leo survived the Battle of Versinikia in 813 by abandoning the battlefield, but nevertheless took advantage of this defeat to force the abdication of Michael I in his favor on 11 July 813. In a diplomatic move, he wrote a letter to Patriarch Nikephoros in order to reassure him of his orthodoxy (Nikephoros being obviously afraid of a possible iconoclast revival). One month later, during his entrance to the Palace quarter, he kneeled before the icon of Christ at the Chalke Gate. A further step in preventing future usurpations was the castration of Michael's sons.

With Krum of Bulgaria blockading Constantinople by land, Leo V had inherited a precarious situation.  He offered to negotiate in person with the invader and attempted to have him killed in an ambush.  The stratagem failed, and although Krum abandoned his siege of the capital, he captured and depopulated Adrianople and Arcadiopolis. When Krum died in spring 814, Leo V defeated the Bulgarians in the environs of Mesembria (Nesebar) and the two states concluded a 30-year peace in 815. According to some sources, Krum participated in the battle and abandoned the battlefield heavily injured.

With the iconodule policy of his predecessors associated with defeats at the hands of Bulgarians and Arabs, Leo V reinstituted Iconoclasm after deposing patriarch Nikephoros and convoking a synod at Constantinople in 815. 

The Emperor used his rather moderate iconoclast policy to seize the properties of iconodules and monasteries, such as the rich Stoudios Monastery, whose influential iconodule abbot, Theodore the Studite, he exiled. Leo V appointed competent military commanders from among his own comrades-in-arms, including Michael the Amorian and Thomas the Slav. He also persecuted the  Paulicians. 

When Leo jailed Michael for suspicion of conspiracy, the latter organized the assassination of the Emperor in the palace chapel of St. Stephen on Christmas Eve, 820. Leo was attending the matins service when a group of assassins disguised as members of the choir due to sing in the service suddenly threw off their robes and drew their weapons. 

In the dim light they mistook the officiating priest for the Emperor and the confusion allowed Leo to snatch a heavy cross from the altar and defend himself. He called for his guards, but the conspirators had barred the doors and within a few moments a sword stroke had severed his arm, and he fell before the communion-table, where his body was hewed in pieces. His remains were dumped unceremoniously in the snow and the assassins hurried to the dungeons to free Michael II. 

Unfortunately for them Leo had hidden the key on his person, and since it was too early in the morning to find a blacksmith Michael was hastily crowned as emperor with the iron clasps still around his legs. Leo's family (including his mother and his wife, Theodosia) was exiled to monasteries in the Princes' Islands. His four sons (including ex co-emperor Symbatios) were castrated, a procedure so brutally carried out that one of them died during the "operation".

Even sources vehemently hostile to Leo (Theophanes Continuatus, Patriarch Nikephoros) acknowledge his competence in managing state affairs. Unfortunately, as with all iconoclast emperors, his actions and intentions cannot be easily reconstructed due to the extreme bias of the iconodule sources (there are no surviving contemporary iconoclast sources of any kind).

Children

All known children of Leo V are traditionally attributed to his wife Theodosia, a daughter of the patrician Arsaber. Genesius records four sons:
 Symbatios (Συμβάτιος), renamed Constantine, co-emperor from 814 to 820. Castrated and exiled following the assassination of his father.
 Basil. Castrated and exiled following the assassination of his father. Still alive in 847, recorded to have supported the election of Patriarch Ignatius of Constantinople.
 Gregory. Castrated and exiled following the assassination of his father. Still alive in 847, recorded to have supported the election of Patriarch Ignatius of Constantinople.
 Theodosios (died in 820). Died soon after his castration.
 Anna, who married Hmayeak, a Mamikonian prince (died c. 797), by whom she had Konstantinos, an officer at the court of Emperor Michael III.

Possible descendants
Nicholas Adontz in his book The age and origins of the emperor Basil I (1933) expressed a theory that Leo V and Theodosia were ancestors of Basil I. The theory was partly based on the account of his ancestry given by Constantine VII, a grandson of Basil I, as well as the accounts given by Theophanes Continuatus.  Basil I, according to these accounts, was a son of peasants. His mother is named by Constantine VII as "Pankalo". The name of his father was not recorded, but the names Symbatios and Constantine have been suggested; both were names used by the eldest sons of Basil, with eldest sons of Byzantines typically named after their grandfathers.  The paternal grandfather of Basil is named as Maiactes. The paternal grandmother was not named but was identified as a daughter of "Leo", a citizen of Constantinople. Adontz identified this Leo as Leo V, which would make Leo V and Theodosia great-grandparents of Basil I.  Adontz also suggested Constantine VII had made a mistake in the generations separating Maiactes and Basil. This suggests that Basil was a great-grandson of Maiactes and not old enough to have seen the wars with Krum of Bulgaria, which would make Leo V and Theodosia fourth-generation ancestors of Basil.

The theory has been accepted by several genealogists, including Christian Settipani in his search for descent from antiquity. The name "Anna" has been suggested for the daughter of Leo V and Theodosia, because it was given to daughters of Basil I, Leo VI the Wise, Constantine VII and Romanos II--almost every emperor that would claim descent from this woman.

See also

List of Byzantine emperors

References
The Oxford Dictionary of Byzantium, Oxford University Press, 1991.

External links
 Leo V coinage

750s births
820 deaths
8th-century Armenian people
9th-century Armenian people
8th-century Byzantine people
9th-century Byzantine emperors
9th-century murdered monarchs
Armenian Byzantine emperors
Assassinated Byzantine emperors
Byzantine Iconoclasm
Deaths by blade weapons
Governors of the Anatolic Theme
Protostratores
810s in the Byzantine Empire
820s in the Byzantine Empire
Byzantine people of Armenian descent